Pierre-Alain Parot (27 April 1950 – 6 February 2023) was a French stained-glass artist.

Biography
Born in Dijon on 27 April 1950, Parot learned stained-glass art in the workshop of his father, Marcel Parot.

In 2019, he helped to restore stained-glass windows impacted by the Notre-Dame fire.

Pierre-Alain Parot died on 6 February 2023, at the age of 72.

Works
14 stained-glass windows of the 
Restoration of the millennium stained-glass window of the Strasbourg Cathedral
Église Notre-Dame de Talant
Stained-glass window in the left transept of the Tours Cathedral

References

1950 births
2023 deaths
20th-century French male artists
21st-century French male artists
Artists from Dijon